Francis Vigo born Giuseppe Maria Francesco Vigo (December 13, 1747 – March 22, 1836) was an Italian-American who aided the American colonial forces during the Revolutionary War and helped found a public university in Vincennes, Indiana.

Born in Mondovì, Italy, he served with the Spanish Army in New Orleans. In 1772 he established a fur trading business in St. Louis.  In 1783, Vigo moved to Vincennes and operated a fur trading business there.

American Revolution
Vigo often aided American forces during the Revolutionary War, most famously as an informant to George Rogers Clark.  Vigo was sent by Clark to Post Vincennes to inspect and report on the conditions there, but was captured by American Indians and turned over to Lt-Gov Henry Hamilton, who had recaptured Vincennes for the Crown.  Vigo was a Spanish citizen and thus, in 1778, considered a non-combatant, but Hamilton was suspicious of Vigo and held him on parole until the French citizens of Vincennes, led by Father Gibault, demanded that he be released at the threat of cutting off local supplies to Fort Sackville.

Hamilton released Vigo on the condition that he would not "do any thing injurious to the British interests on his way to St. Louis."  True to his word, Vigo travelled down the Wabash, Ohio, and Mississippi Rivers to St. Louis before returning to Kaskaskia to inform Col. Clark of the British presence in Vincennes, which prompted Clark to recapture the town in 1779.

In addition to his services as a patriot and spy, Vigo was the foremost financier of the American Revolution in the Northwest.  When Clark arrived with Continental promissary notes of paper, Vigo exchanged them evenly for hard coin.  The American dollar traded poorly among the French citizens, and soon became worthless.  Vigo was never repaid during his lifetime, and would recollect that the term douleur to the French signifies grief or pain.

Post-War years
In the 1790s Vigo traded with American merchants on the East Coast of the U.S.

In 1801, Vigo petitioned the U.S. Congress for a donation of land to establish the Jefferson Academy in Vincennes. In 1806, Vigo was named one of the original trustees of the now renamed Vincennes University.

From 1790 to 1810 he was a colonel in the Knox County Militia before resigning, citing age and infirmity.

In 1818 Vigo County, Indiana, was established and named for him.

After he was royally feted during a visit to Terre Haute, the Vigo County seat, on July 4, 1834, Vigo revised his will to provide money to purchase a large bell for the Vigo County Courthouse, should he ever be compensated by the United States for services rendered during the Revolution.

As an Italian surname, perhaps from Galician origin in Vigo, Vigo's name is pronounced "VEE-goh" in his native Italian. However, many people pronounce it (in referring to the many streets, buildings, schools, towns, townships, or cities named after him) as “VIH-go.”

Death
Francis Vigo died March 22, 1836, while living in the home of Jean Baptiste and Elizabeth (Martin) LaPlante, in Vincennes.  It was not until 1875, that his estate was allowed payment for $8,016.00, the amount he had used to fund Clark's aborted campaign to take Fort Detroit.  This was the only expense the government would officially recognize, but it came with $41,282.60 in interest.  As Vigo had no blood-related descendants, however, the government only had to pay for the expenses requested in Vigo's will (which included a bell for the courthouse in Vigo County).

Legacy
Vigo County, Indiana, on the Wabash River north of Vincennes, is named for Francis Vigo, as is Vigo, Indiana.  The George Rogers Clark National Historical Park erected a statue of Vigo by John Angel in 1934, on the waterfront of the Wabash River.  Vigo was featured in a collectors coin to celebrate the bicentennial of Indiana statehood.

References

Commager, Henry Steele and Richard B. Morris. The Spirit of Seventy-Six.  The story of the American Revolution as told by its participants.  Castle Books.  HarperCollins Publishers.  ©1958.    .
Law, Judge.  The Colonial History of Vincennes  Harvy, Mason & Co.  1858. 
Somes, Joseph Henry VandeBurgh.  Old Vincennes  Graphic Books, New York.  1962. .

External links

George Rogers Clark National Historical Park, National Park Service
"Francis Vigo Papers, 1751-1873, Collection Guide", Indiana Historical Society
Francis Vigo Papers On Line, Indiana State University
Francis Vigo Gravesite

1747 births
1836 deaths
American fur traders
Financiers of the American Revolution
Indiana educational history
Indiana in the American Revolution
Patriots in the American Revolution
Italian people of the American Revolution
Vincennes University
People from Mondovì
People from Vincennes, Indiana
University and college founders
Burials in Indiana
Italian emigrants to the United States